This is a link page for all twenty-three civil parishes in County Monaghan in the Republic of Ireland. Alternative spellings of parish names are denoted directly afterward in brackets.

Aghabog
Aghnamullen
Ballybay
Clones
Clontibret
Currin
Donagh
Donaghmoyne
Drummully
Drumsnat
Ematris
Errigal Truagh [Errigal Trough]
Inishkeen
Killanny
Killeevan
Kilmore
Magheracloone
Magheross
Monaghan
Muckno
Tydavnet [Tedavnet]
Tyholland [Tehallan]
Tullycorbet

References

See also
List of townlands in County Monaghan

Towns
Civil parishes